Jatingaleh is a village in Candisari district, Semarang city, Central Java, Indonesia. Its population is estimated at around 12,500 residents. Although it was historically a distinct village, due to urbanization it is now surrounded by the greater city of Semarang.

References

Semarang
Villages in Central Java